Strzyza is an administrative district of the city of Gdańsk, Poland, named after a creek. It is a part of the Wrzeszcz borough. Most of it is covered by small family houses.

As part of the Crown of the Kingdom of Poland, Strzyża was a private church village of the Cistercian Monastery in Oliwa, administratively located in the Gdańsk County in the Pomeranian Voivodeship.

The Gdańsk Strzyża railway station is located in Strzyża.

Gallery

References

External links
 Map of Strzyża

Districts of Gdańsk